In South American history, republiquetas were independence-seeking guerrilla groups in the period 1811 to 1825 in Upper Peru (present-day Bolivia). Their first historiographical mention and description came from Argentine president and historian Bartolomé Mitre. After the defeat of the first auxiliary Argentine army in the Battle of Huaqui, an amalgam of urban republicans, peasants, and Argentine agents effectively occupied vast, generally rural areas. The guerrillas received support from another three military expeditions from Argentina from 1813 to 1817, but all of them were eventually vanquished after a number of early successes. The largest cities were occupied only for brief periods and eventually nearly all of these guerrilla movements disbanded or were defeated by royalist forces before Marshall Sucre's campaign routed the remaining troops still loyal to the Spanish crown in 1825.

Notes

See also
Bolivian War of Independence

Bolivian War of Independence
Guerrilla wars
Colonial Bolivia
1810s in Bolivia
1820s in Bolivia
Republicans